Jackdaws are two species of bird in the genus Coloeus closely related to, but generally smaller than, the crows and ravens (Corvus). They have a blackish crown, wings and tail, the rest of the plumage being paler. The word Coloeus is New Latin, from the Ancient Greek for jackdaws: .

Taxonomy
While some authors consider Coloeus a subgenus of Corvus, others have classified Coloeus as a distinct genus in the family Corvidae. Following Birds of South Asia: The Ripley Guide, the International Ornithological Congress has also reassigned the two jackdaw species from the genus Corvus to the genus Coloeus.

Species
The species are the western jackdaw (Coloeus monedula), which breeds in the British Isles and western Europe, Scandinavia, northern Asia and Northern Africa, and its eastern counterpart, the Daurian jackdaw (Coloeus dauuricus), found from China and eastern Siberia to Japan. The eastern species is smaller than the western jackdaw, and in eastern adults the pale areas of the plumage are almost white, whereas in the western bird these areas are pale grey. The iris is pale in western jackdaw and dark in Daurian jackdaw. The two species are otherwise very similar in shape, calls, and behaviour. There is an argument for lumping the subgenus members as one species, but they do not interbreed where their ranges meet in Mongolia.

References

Further reading
 

 
Taxa named by Johann Jakob Kaup